Text+Kritik (stylized text+kritik) is a quarterly German journal for literature, music, film, and cultural studies in which German-language writers have their works analysed and presented by fellow writers and experts in literary research and criticism.

It was founded in 1963 by Heinz Ludwig Arnold who edited it from then until his death in 2011. At the time of the first edition, which appeared in 1963 and was dedicated to Günter Grass, the editorial team consisted of Lothar Baier, Gerd Hemmerich, Jochen Meyer, Wolf Wondratschek and Heinz Ludwig Arnold himself.

Each edition is focused on a different theme, which usually means it deals with one specific German-language writer. Featured writers have been as varied as Theodor W. Adorno, Hannah Arendt, Arno Schmidt, Paul Celan, Daniel Kehlmann, Herta Müller, Yoko Tawada, Hubert Fichte, Emine Sevgi Özdamar, Friedrich Dürrenmatt, Felicitas Hoppe and Rainald Goetz.

In 2013 Text+Kritik celebrated its fiftieth anniversary with a special volume, Zukunft der Literatur (Future of Literature).

References

External links
 

Quarterly journals
German-language journals
Literary magazines published in Germany
Music magazines published in Germany
Visual arts magazines published in Germany
Film magazines